Ellenton is a town in Colquitt County, Georgia, United States. Its population was 281 at the 2010 census. It was incorporated in 1970 by the Georgia General Assembly. It is located at  (31.176563, -83.588016).

Demographics

As of the census of 2000, there were 336 people, 109 households, and 81 families residing in the town. The racial makeup of the town was 73.81% White, 13.39% African American, 2.08% Asian, 5.06% from other races, and 5.65% from two or more races. Hispanic or Latino people of any race were 18.75% of the population.

There were 109 households, out of which 27.5% had children under the age of 18 living with them, 60.6% were married couples living together, 9.2% had a female householder with no husband present, and 24.8% were non-families. 21.1% of all households were made up of individuals, and 11.0% had someone living alone who was 65 years of age or older.  The average household size was 2.93 and the average family size was 3.26.

In the town, the population was spread out, with 23.5% under the age of 18, 14.0% from 18 to 24, 28.0% from 25 to 44, 20.8% from 45 to 64, and 13.7% who were 65 years of age or older.  The median age was 33 years. For every 100 females, there were 121.1 males.  For every 100 females age 18 and over, there were 117.8 males.

The median income for a household in the town was $32,857, and the median income for a family was $37,250. Males had a median income of $28,125 versus $20,208 for females. The per capita income for the town was $11,924.  About 16.5% of families and 18.8% of the population were below the poverty line, including 14.1% of those under age 18 and 34.6% of those age 65 or over.

External links
Ellenton, GA official website

References

Towns in Colquitt County, Georgia
Towns in Georgia (U.S. state)